The Widow  is a British television drama series created and written by Harry and Jack Williams, airing on both British ITV and American streaming service Amazon Prime Video, with Prime also carrying the series internationally. It stars Kate Beckinsale as a woman who believes that her husband was killed in a plane crash three years earlier, but then discovers that he is still alive in the Congo. The show was released on Amazon Prime Video on 1 March 2019 before being broadcast on ITV from 8 April 2019.

Premise 
The series follows Georgia Wells (Kate Beckinsale) whose husband Will died in a plane crash on a trip to the Congo in Africa. Three years later, she sees a man resembling him on a news story reporting civil unrest in the Democratic Republic of the Congo, and she travels to Kinshasa to uncover the truth. She starts to look for answers, particularly why her husband evidently faked his own death. The eight-episode series features multiple story lines and explores themes such as violence and corruption.

Production 
The Widow is a co-production of British ITV and Amazon Video. It was filmed in South Africa, Wales, and Rotterdam. The heat in some of the locations became difficult for Beckinsale, who was hospitalised after passing out while shooting a scene.

Cast
Kate Beckinsale as Georgia Wells
Charles Dance as Martin Benson
Alex Kingston as Judith Gray
Babs Olusanmokun as General Azikiwe
Shalom Nyandiko as Adidja
Luiana Bonfim as Gaëlle Kazadi
Louise Brealey as Beatrix
Bart Fouche as Pieter Bello/Hennie Botha
Ólafur Darri Ólafsson as Ariel
Howard Charles as Tom
Réginal Kudiwu as Djamba
Jacky Ido as Emmanuel
Matthew Le Nevez as Will
Matthew Gravelle as Joshua

Episodes

Reception 
On Rotten Tomatoes season 1 has an approval rating of 56% based on reviews from 27 critics. The site's consensus states: Ferociously ambitious, The Widow boasts Kate Beckinsale's killer action chops but goes astray in a jungle of problematic tropes and unsatisfying twists.

References

External links
 
 Behind the scenes : the score on YouTube

2019 British television series debuts
2019 British television series endings
2010s British drama television series
2010s British television miniseries
ITV television dramas
Television series by All3Media
Television shows set in Africa